Islam in Canada is a minority religion practised mostly by the immigrants and their descendants from Muslim majority countries. Muslims have lived in Canada since 1871 and the first mosque was established in 1938. Most Canadian Muslims are Sunni, while a significant minority are Shia and Ahmadiyya. There are a number of Islamic organizations and seminaries (madrasas). Opinion polls show most Muslims feel "very proud" to be Canadians, and majority are religious and attend mosque at least once a week. The majority of Canadian Muslims live in the provinces of Ontario and Quebec.

The population of Muslims in Canada is 4.9% as of 2021 up from 3.2% as of 2011. In the Greater Toronto Area, 10% of the population is Muslim, up from 7.7% in 2011, and in Greater Montreal, 8.7% of the population is Muslim, up from 6% in 2011.

History

Four years after Canada's founding in 1867, the 1871 Canadian Census found 13 European Muslims among the population.  The first Muslim organization in Canada was registered by immigrants from greater Syria living in Regina, Saskatchewan in 1934. The first Canadian mosque was constructed in Edmonton in 1938 when there were approximately 700 European Muslims in the country. The building is now part of the museum at Fort Edmonton Park. The years after World War II saw a small increase in the Muslim population. However, Muslims were still a distinct minority. It was only after the removal of European immigration preferences in the late 1960s and early 1970s that Muslims began to arrive in significant numbers.

Bosniaks and Albanian Muslims were the founders of Jami Mosque, the first mosque in Toronto in 1968, whose readjustment into masjid (originally an old Catholic school building) occurred on June 23, 1973. The mosque was readjusted for the Bosniaks, with the support of the local Christians.  Later, with the action of University of Toronto professor Qadeer Baig, it was purchased by Asian Muslims, while Albanians and Bosniaks later founded the Albanian Muslim Society and Bosanska džamija (Bosnian Mosque) respectively. The oldest mosque in Toronto, with the oldest minaret in Ontario built in Osmanic style is in Etobicoke, part of the Bosnian Islamic Centre.

The first Madrasa (Islamic seminary) in North America, Al-Rashid Islamic Institute was established in Cornwall, Ontario in 1983 to teach  Hafiz and Ulama  and focuses on the traditional Hanafi school of thought. The Seminary was established by Mazhar Alam, originally from Bihar, India, under the direction of his teacher the leading Indian Tablighi scholar Muhammad Zakariya Kandhlawi. Due to its proximity to the US border city of Massena the school has historically had a high percentage of American students. Their most prominent graduate, Muhammad Alshareef completed his Hifz in the early 1990s then went on to form the AlMaghrib Institute.

As with immigrants in general, Muslim immigrants have come to Canada for a variety of reasons. These include higher education, security, employment, and family reunification. Others have come for religious and political freedom, and safety and security, leaving behind civil wars, persecution, and other forms of civil and ethnic strife. In the 1980s, Canada became an important place of refuge for those fleeing the Lebanese Civil War. The 1990s saw Somali Muslims arrive in the wake of the Somali Civil War as well as Bosniaks fleeing the breakup of the former Yugoslavia. However Canada has yet to receive any significant numbers of Iraqis fleeing the Iraqi War. But in general almost every Muslim country in the world has sent immigrants to Canada – from Pakistan, Bosnia and Herzegovina and Albania to Yemen and Bangladesh.

According to the Canadian Census of 1971 there were 33,000 Muslims in Canada. In the 1970s large-scale non-European immigration to Canada began. This was reflected in the growth of the Muslim community in Canada. In 1981, the Census listed 98,000 Muslims. The 1991 Census indicated 253,265 Muslims. 

By 2001, the Islamic community in Canada had grown to more than 579,000. In the same year, the fertility rate for Muslims in Canada was higher than the rate for other Canadians (an average of 2.4 children per woman for Muslims in 2001, compared with 1.6 children per woman for other populations in Canada).

Population estimates for the Census 2006 pointed to a figure of 800,000. As of May 2013, Muslims account for 3.2% of the total population, with a total of over a million, and Islam has become the fastest growing religion in Canada.

In January 2017, six Muslims were killed in a shooting attack at a Quebec city mosque.

In the contemporary era, there are halal restaurants across Canada, including over 1000 in the Greater Toronto Area.

One of the first Islamic internet radio stations, Canadian Islamic Broadcasting Network, was started in 2019.

Demography

Population

National and ethnic origins 
According to the 2011 National Household Survey, there were 424,925 Muslims living in the Greater Toronto Area equalling 7.7% of the total metropolitan population, of which the Muslim community consists of persons of Pakistani, Bangladeshi, Indian, Iranian, African, Egyptian/Arab, Caucasian, Southeast Asian, and Latin descent. Greater Montreal's Muslim community was 221,040 in 2011 or nearly 6% of the total metropolitan population which includes a highly diverse Muslim population from Western/Southern Europe, Caribbean, North Africa, the Middle East, and the Indian subcontinent.  Canada's national capital Ottawa hosts many Lebanese, South Asian and Somali Muslims, where the Muslim community numbered approximately 65,880 or 5.5% in 2011. In addition to Toronto, Ottawa and Montreal, nearly every major Canadian metropolitan area has a Muslim community, including Vancouver (73,215), where more than a third are of Iranian descent, Calgary (58,310), Edmonton (46,125), Windsor (15,575), Winnipeg (11,265), and Halifax (7,540). In recent years, there has been rapid population growth in Calgary and Edmonton because of the booming economy.

Branches or denominations 
Major Canadian cities have local Muslim organizations that deal mainly with issues pertaining to their home city, but that support national associations. Most Muslim organizations on the national level are umbrella groups and coordination bodies. Student-led initiatives are generally well supported and successful, including annual events such as MuslimFest and the Reviving the Islamic Spirit conference, the largest Islamic event in Canada.

Sunni Muslims 
The majority of Canadian Muslims follow Sunni Islam.

Shia Muslims

Ahmadiyya Muslims 

The Ahmadiyya Muslim Community has about 50 Local Chapters scattered across Canada, mainly in southern Ontario. The community have 25 places of worship in Canada. Baitun Nur is the largest mosque in Canada.

Progressive Muslims 
In May 2009, the Toronto Unity Mosque / el-Tawhid Juma Circle was founded by Laury Silvers, a University of Toronto religious studies scholar, alongside Muslim gay-rights activists El-Farouk Khaki and Troy Jackson. Unity Mosque/ETJC is a gender-equal, LGBT+ affirming, mosque.

Geographical distribution

Provinces & territories 
Table 1: Muslim Population of Canada in 1991, 2001, and 2011, 2021.

Metropolitan Areas 
Table 2: Muslim Population in Top 20 Metropolitan Areas based on Canada Census 2001, 2011, and 2021.

Federal Electoral Districts

Ontario 
 Mississauga--Erin Mills (26.93%)
 Milton (24.28%)
 Don Valley East (23.76%)
 Mississauga Centre (22.63%)
 Scarborough--Guildwood (20.19%)
 Mississauga--Malton (18.87%)
 Ottawa South (18.69%)
 Scarborough Southwest (18.47%)
 Scarborough Centre (18.18%)
 Don Valley West (17.84%)
 Windsor West (16.79%)
 Mississauga--Streetsville (16.50%)
 Etobicoke North (15.67%)

Quebec 
 Saint-Leonard--Saint-Michel (26.65%)
 Saint-Laurent (23.20%)
 Ahuntsic-Cartierville (19.04%)
 Bourassa (18.13%)
 Vimy (16.81%)
 Papineau (15.54%)

Alberta 
 Calgary Skyview (18.22%)
 Calgary Forest Lawn (15.43%)

Source: Canada 2021 Census Open Data Release

As the Canadian Charter of Rights and Freedoms guarantees freedom of religious expression, Canadian Muslims face no official religious discrimination but have been victims of many hate crimes which have been increasingly going up.  Learn more about Islamophobia in Canada.

Under Section 2(a) of the Charter, the wearing of a hijab is permitted in schools and places of work, although Quebec has ruled that medical faculties are not required to accommodate Muslim women who wish to be served by female employees. Religious holidays and dietary restrictions are also respected, but outside major urban areas it may be difficult to find halal food. It is also often difficult to observe Islamic rules against usury. Some Muslims in some parts of Canada have asked to have family dispute courts to oversee small family cases but were faced with rigorous opposition from both within the Muslim community (both conservative and liberal), and by non-Muslim groups.

In 2011, the Harper government attempted to ban the niqab during citizenship ceremonies. In 2015, the Federal Court of Appeal ruled against the ban, and the Supreme Court turned down the government's appeal.

Canadian Muslim Social Organizations
There are several organizations working to support the Canadian Muslim community by representing their causes and voices, and channeling the efforts of Muslims for the greater good of Canadians as well as people struggling in other parts of the world. Some are listed below:

 Muslim Association of Canada (MAC) is a charitable organization and a grassroots movement to establish an Islamic presence in Canada that is balanced, constructive, and integrated in the social fabric and culture of Canada.
 National Council of Canadian Muslims (NCCM) is an independent, non-partisan and non-profit organization that protects Canadian human rights and civil liberties, challenges discrimination and Islamophobia.  
 Islamic Relief Canada helps Canadian Muslims channel charitable contributions to not only Canadians but people in need across the globe. Their platform helps strengthen the relationship between donors and beneficiaries by providing a high level of transparency. 
 Canadian Council of Muslim Women (CCMW) is an organization dedicated to the empowerment, equality and equity of all Muslim women in Canada. It has chapters all over Canada and has launched several projects through community engagement, public policy, stakeholder engagement and amplified awareness of the social injustices that Muslim women and girls endure in Canada.
 Muslim Welfare Canada works to fight hunger through its food banks and meals on wheels programs for senior citizens. They also run homes/shelters for women and children as well as refugees.
 Salaam Canada is a volunteer-run national organization dedicated to creating space for people who identify as both Muslim and queer and trans.
Canadian Islamic Broadcasting Network - An online radio station that was setup in 2019 with the intention of broadcasting Islamic information across Canada via internet radio. The main focus of the station is to provide Islamic Talk programming.

Recent controversies
On December 12, 2011, the Canadian Minister of Citizenship and Immigration issued a decree banning the niqab or any other face-covering garments for women swearing their oath of citizenship; the hijab was not affected. This edict was later overturned by a Court of Appeal on the grounds of being unlawful.

In 2017 the Islamic Society of North America, Islamic Services of Canada and Canadian Islamic Trust Foundation were stripped of their status as charities by the government of Canada after an investigation revealed links to a foreign militant group. Both the stripped associations shared their postal address in Mississauga with ISNA Canada.

In 2018, the Ottawa Islamic Centre and Assalam Mosque was stripped of its charity status by the Canadian government because many of its guest speakers were misogynistic, homophobic, racist and promoted violence. The Canada Revenue Agency also raised concerns that radicalized individuals had attended the mosque, one of whom was imprisoned for having attempted to join the Islamic State of Iraq and the Levant.

Identity and beliefs

Opinion of Muslims

In a 2016 Environics poll, 83% of Muslims were "very proud" to be Canadian, compared with 73% of non-Muslim Canadians who said the same thing. Canadian Muslims reported "Canada's freedom and democracy" as the greatest source of pride, and  "multiculturalism and diversity" as the second greatest. 94% of Canadian Muslims reported a "strong" or "very strong" sense of belonging to Canada. 78% of Canadian Muslims attend mosque at least once a week. 73% of women wear some sort of head-covering in public (58% wear the hijab, 13% wear the chador and 2% wear the niqab). Both pride in being Canadian and having a strong sense of belonging had increased in Canadian Muslims as compared to a 2006 survey. Mosque attendance and wearing a head covering in public had also increased since the 2006 survey.

A 2016 survey found that 36% of Canadian Muslims (47% of those aged 18–34) agreed that homosexuality should be generally accepted by society, while 43% disagreed. Older Muslims (55%) and those with the lowest incomes (56%) were more likely to disagree. The acceptance of homosexuality was higher among the Muslims born in Canada(52%) and South Africa (42%) than Muslims born in Pakistan (0%), Middle East (0%) and North Africa (0%)

Opinion on Muslims
According to the surveys conducted by the Angus Reid Institute (ARI), 24% of the Canadians had a favorable opinion of Islam in 2013 which increased to 34% in the 2016 survey and in Quebec, it increased from 16% in 2013 to 32% in 2016.

The Liberal Party (45%) voters and New Democratic Party voters (42%) have more favourable opinion on Muslims, than compared to Conservative Party voters (24%).

A majority (75%) of the Canadians strongly support Muslim women wearing Hijab in Public. However, the wearing of full face and body covering niqab and burka is strongly opposed. Only three-in-ten Canadians are supportive of it.

Media
Little Mosque on the Prairie was a Canadian sitcom on CBC Television created by Zarqa Nawaz.
Ginella Massa is the first Canadian hijab wearing news anchor for CityNews Toronto.

See also 

 Category containing Canadian Muslims
 Islamophobia in Canada
 List of Canadian Muslims
 List of mosques in Canada
 Religion in Canada
History of Islam in the Arctic and Subarctic regions

Groups and councils 
 Canadian Islamic Congress
 Council on American-Islamic Relations
 National Council of Canadian Muslims
 Muslim Canadian Congress

References

External links 

 Canada Religious Census 2001 
 Islamic Association in Canada
 Canadian Council Of Moslem Women

 
Canada